Solomon Golub (Latvia, 27 February 1887 – Bronx, New York, 18 June 1952) was a Russian Empire-born, naturalized American, song composer. A collection of his Yiddish songs was published by Metro Music in 1936.

References

External links
 STM - mp3s of three Yiddish songs

American male composers
American composers
1887 births
1952 deaths
20th-century American male musicians
Emigrants from the Russian Empire to the United States